Douglas D. Alder (born 1932) was president of Dixie College (now Utah Tech University) from 1986-1993.

Alder was born and raised in Salt Lake City, Utah. He studied at the University of Utah getting a bachelor's and master's degree there. He then earned a PhD at the University of Oregon. He was for many years a professor of European history at Utah State University. While there he was director of the honors program. He edited the work Cache Valley: Essays of Her Past and People.

During his administration the number of buildings at Dixie State was expanded. It was also under his direction that the College Inn, part of Dixie State's Elderhostel Program, was developed.

Alder served as president of the Mormon History Association in 1977-1978. He is a Latter-day Saint and served as a counselor in the presidency of the St. George Utah Temple.

Alder wrote with Blaine M. Yorgason and Richard A. Schmutz the book All That Was Promised: The St. George Temple and the Unfolding of the Restoration (Salt Lake City: Deseret Book, 2013). He also wrote A History of Washington County: From Isolation to Destination in 1996 with Karl Brooks. In 2010 his A Century of Dixie State College of Utah was published. He also wrote the novel Sons of Bear Lake published in 2002.

Sources
Dixie State University bio
Mormon Scholars Testify bio of Alder
Washington County Historical Society bio
Mormon Literature Database bio
Deseret News article on Alder's retirement

1932 births
Living people
University of Utah alumni
University of Oregon alumni
Utah State University faculty
Utah Tech University people
American male non-fiction writers
Utah Tech University faculty
Latter Day Saints from Utah
20th-century American male writers
20th-century American historians
21st-century American male writers
21st-century American historians
Writers from Salt Lake City
Historians from Utah